Nicholas Martin Gledhill (born 7 March 1975) is an Australian film, stage actor, voice artist, writer and choreographer

Biography 
Gledhill was born in Sydney to parents Bobbie Gledhill and actor Arthur Dignam. He grew up in Glebe, New South Wales and went to school at St Andrew's Cathedral School. At the age of 19 he moved to England, to try out for drama school and attended Birmingham School of Speech and Drama from which he graduated in 1998.

He is possibly best known for one of his early roles, that of PS in Careful, He Might Hear You (1983), the story of a young boy in the middle of a custody battle between his two aunts and based on the novel by Sumner Locke Elliott. Gledhill was nominated for a Best Actor award by the Australian Film Institute for this role in 1984.

Gledhill has worked mainly in film and television, and as a Stage Combat Master and choreographer, an acting teacher and is a prize-winning writer (ICI/STC Young Writers Competition).

Some of his stage roles include Edgar and Sebastian in the Shakespeare Globe Centre Australia's production of King Lear and The Tempest. He was featured in a Sunday Life article on child stars and performed various roles at the Edinburgh Festival, in a collection of 12 short plays called Light Bites and Tasty Treats.

He recently played Demetrius, in the Acting Factory production of A Midsummer Night's Dream and his most recent role was as Watch in the SpaceCraft Productions production of the official Sydney Fringe Festival selection, Closing Time.

Nicholas is currently working on the formation of a new political party – The Arts Party of Australia. He, along with PJ Collins, is running a crowd-sourcing campaign on indiegogo to gather the funds and the list of signed-up members required to register the party. A founding committee has been formed to steer the party during its founding period and deliver a more detailed policy statement. The Arts Party has garnered a large amount of support thus far.

Personal life 
He lives in Sydney, New South Wales with his wife, Amelia, and their two children, Tigerlily and Wolfgang.

Filmography

Stage

References

External links
 
 Personal website
 Official Facebook Page
 Article on being a child star

1975 births
Living people
Australian male film actors
Australian male stage actors
Australian male voice actors
Australian singer-songwriters
Australian male child actors
Australian male television actors
Alumni of Birmingham School of Acting
20th-century Australian male actors
21st-century Australian male actors
21st-century Australian singers